Judith Lauand (26 May 1922 – 9 December 2022) was a Brazilian painter and printmaker. She is considered a pioneer of the Brazilian modernist movement that started in the 1950s, and was the only female member of the concrete art movement based in São Paulo, the Grupo Ruptura.

Early life and education 
Lauand was born in Pontal, São Paulo, Brazil.

In the mid-1950s, Lauand graduated from the Escola de Belas Artes in Araraquara, São Paulo in Brazil with a degree in fine arts. While at Escola de Belas Artes, Lauand's education was based in traditional fine arts. Domênico Lazzarini and Maria Ybarra de Almeida taught her painting and Lívio Abramo taught her printmaking.

Career 

After graduating from college, Lauand worked as a teacher in Araraquara and produced artwork on the side, which at that time was in the style of expressionist figurative paintings.

In 1953, Lauand moved to São Paulo. In 1954, she worked as a gallery monitor at the São Paulo Art Biennial, which led to her connecting with fellow artists who were part of the concrete art movement, Grupo Ruptura: Anatol Władysław, Geraldo de Barros, Leopoldo Haar, Lothar Charoux, Luís Sacilotto, Kazmer Féjer, and Waldemar Cordeiro. Lauand soon joined the group, becoming their only female member.

Lauand's work is rooted in the abstract art from the 1950s, with a movement in 1954 to a more rigid and analytical approach. Starting in the 1960s, Lauand began incorporating non-traditional materials like paper clips and other items into her pieces, making the surfaces uneven and creating different effects.

Lauand was the only artist among her contemporaries who signed her paintings, and signed on the front of the painting. This was seen as a more traditional approach, and was a rejection of the theoretical aesthetic of what other artists were doing.

Lauand worked across many different mediums. As a painter, she created works using acrylic, enamel, oil, and tempera paints, incorporating gouaches and/or collages. Lauand's output also took the form of embroidery, sculptures, woodcuts, and tapestries.

Death 
Lauand turned 100 on 26 May 2022, and died in São Paulo on 9 December.

Selected exhibitions 
Group exhibitions
 1956: "Exposicão Nacional de Arte Concreta." Museu de Arte Moderna (São Paulo)
 1960: "Konkrete Kunst." 50 Jahre Entwicklung, Helmhaus (Zurich) [traveling exhibition]
 1965: VIII Bienal Internacional de Arte de São Paulo (São Paulo)
 1967: IX Bienal Internacional de Arte de São Paulo (São Paulo)
 1969: X Bienal Internacional de Arte de São Paulo (São Paulo)
 1977: "Projeto construtivo brasileiro na arte. 1950–1962." Museu de Arte Moderna do Rio de Janeiro (Rio de Janeiro); Pinacoteca do Estado de São Paulo (São Paulo)
 1984: "Tradição e ruptura." Sãntese de arte e cultura brasileras, Fundação Bienal de São Paulo (São Paulo)
 1994: Bienal Brasil Século XX (São Paulo) [traveling exhibition]
 1997: I Bienal de Artes Visuais do Mercosul (Porto Alegre)
 2003: "Cuasi-corpus. Arte concreto y neoconcreto de Brasil." Museo de Arte Contemporáneo Internacional Ruãno Tamayo (Mexico City); Museo de Arte Contemporáneo (Monterrey)
 2006: "The Sites of Latin American Abstraction." Cisneros Fontanals Art Foundation (Miami, Florida) [traveling exhibition]
 2007: "The Geometry of Hope. Latin American Abstract Art from the Patricia Phelps de Cisneros Collection." Blanton Museum of Art, The University of Texas at Austin (Austin, Texas); Grey Art Gallery, New York University (New York)
 2007: "Desenho construtivista brasileiro." Museu de Arte Moderna do Rio de Janeiro (Rio de Janeiro)
 2009: "Geometric Abstract Works. The Latin American Vision from the 1950s, 60s and 70s." Henrique Faria Fine Art (New York)
 2010: "Then & Now. Abstraction in Latin American Art from 1950 to Present." 60 Wall Gallery, Deutsche Bank (New York)
 2010: "Vibración. Moderne Kunst aus Lateinamerika." The Ella Fontanals-Cisneros Collection, Bundeskunsthalle (Bonn)
 2017–2018: "Making Art Concrete: Works from Argentina and Brazil in the Colección Patricia Phelps de Cisneros." Getty Center (Los Angeles, California) (29 August 2017 – 11 February 2018)
Solo exhibitions
 1954: Galeria Ambiente (São Paulo)
 1965: Galeria Novas Tendências (São Paulo)
 1977: Museu de Arte Contemporânea da Universidade de São Paulo (São Paulo)
 1984: "Geometria 84." Paulo Figueiredo Galeria de Arte (São Paulo)
 1992: "Efemérides." Museu de Arte Contemporânea da Universidade de São Paulo (São Paulo)
 1996: "Obras de 1954–1960." Galeria Sylvio Nery (São Paulo) [catalogue]
 2007: "50 anos de pintura." Galeria Berenice Arvani (São Paulo)
 2008: "65 anos arte." Galeria Berenice Arvani (São Paulo); Secretaria de Cultura, Araraquara (São Paulo)
 2011: "Judith Lauand: Experiências." Museu de Arte Moderna de São Paulo (20 January – 3 April 2011)
 2013: "Judith Lauand: The 1950s." Stephen Friedman Gallery (London)
 2014–2015: "Judith Lauand: Brazilian Modernist, 1950s-2000s," Driscoll Babcock Galleries (New York, NY) (23 October 2014 – 10 January 2015)
 2017: "Judith Lauand: Brazilian Concrete Abstractions," Driscoll Babcock Galleries (New York, NY) (15 June – 28 July 2017)
 2022–2023: "Judith Lauand: desvio concreto" (Concrete Deviation), São Paulo Museum of Art (MASP) (25 November 2022 – 2 April 2023)

Awards and honors 
 1945: 9th Salão de Belas Artes de Araraquara, Prêmio Estímulo de Desenho
 1952: 15th Salão de Belas Artes de Araraquara, Primeiro Lugar
 1953: 16th Salão de Belas Artes de Araraquara, Prêmio Cidade de Araraquara
 1954: 3rd Salão Paulista de Arte Moderna, Grande Medalha de Bronze
 1955: 4th Salão Paulista de Arte Moderna, Pequena Medalha de Prata
 1958: 7th Salão Paulista de Arte Moderna, Prêmio Aquisição
 1959: 8th Salão Paulista de Arte Moderna, Prêmio Aquisição
 1964: 13th Salão Paulista de Arte Moderna, Prêmio Aquisição

Works and publications 
  – de 19 de novembro (terça-feira) a 17 de dezembro de 1996
  – Catalog of an exhibition held 2 Aug. – 10 September 2007 at the Galeria Berenice Arvani in São Paulo, Brazil
  – Catalog of an exhibition held 4 November – 12 December 2008 at Prefeitura Municipal de Araraquara; and 2 December 2008 – 16 January 2009 at Galeria Berenice Arvani, São Paulo
  – Catalog of an exhibition held at Museu de Arte Moderna de São Paulo, 21 Jan. – 3 April 2011
  – Catalog of an exhibition held 8 February – 9 March 2013 in London
  – Catalog of an exhibition held at Driscoll Babcock Galleries from 23 October – 20 December 2014

References

Further reading 
   – Exhibition at the Fogg Art Museum, Cambridge, MA, 3 March-4 November 2001
  – Published on the occasion of an exhibition held at the Newark Museum, Newark, N.J., 17 Feb. – 23 May 2010 and at the Amon Carter Museum, Fort Worth, Tex., 26 June – 5 September 2010

External links 
 
 Judith Lauand (artist file) at Museum of Modern Art
 

1922 births
2022 deaths
Brazilian artists
Brazilian centenarians
Concrete art
Women centenarians
People from São Paulo (state)